Her Majesty is a 1922 American silent comedy film directed by George Irving and starring Mollie King, Creighton Hale and Rose Tapley.

Synopsis
Orpahned identical twins sisters Rosalie and Susan are separated and brought up in completely different households. One becomes a snob while the other becomes a farm-raised girl next door. Confusion ensues when the latter's boyfriend encounters the former.

Cast
 Mollie King as Susan Bowers / Rosalie Bowers
 Creighton Hale as Ted Harper
 Rose Tapley as Aunt Worthington
 Neville Percy as Wilfred Parkington
 T. Jerome Lawler as 'Slick' Harry

References

Bibliography
 Connelly, Robert B. The Silents: Silent Feature Films, 1910-36, Volume 40, Issue 2. December Press, 1998.
 Munden, Kenneth White. The American Film Institute Catalog of Motion Pictures Produced in the United States, Part 1. University of California Press, 1997.

External links
 

1922 films
1922 comedy films
1920s English-language films
American silent feature films
Silent American comedy films
American black-and-white films
Films directed by George Irving
Associated Exhibitors films
1920s American films